The siege of Fort Augustus took place from 22 February to 1 March 1746, during the Jacobite rising of 1745. After a short siege, the government garrison surrendered to a Jacobite force, which then moved on to besiege Fort William, using artillery captured at Fort Augustus.

Background
After the 1715 rising, a line of forts was built along what is now the Caledonian Canal: the three most important were Fort George, Inverness; Fort Augustus; and Fort William. Their garrisons were reinforced when the 1745 rising began, but the defences had been neglected and were in a poor state. However, it was not until the Jacobites retreated from Stirling Castle in February 1746 that a serious effort was made to capture them.

Despite being well-supplied, Fort George surrendered without fighting; its governor, Major Grant, a close relative of the Jacobite Lord Lovat, was later court-martialled and dismissed. The garrisons at Fort Augustus and Fort William had been raiding the surrounding countryside, much of which belonged to Lochiel and MacDonald of Keppoch. To protect their lands, they demanded that the forts be taken; on 21 February, a contingent of Irish regulars in the French Army under Colonel Walter Stapleton and 1,500 Cameron and MacDonald clansmen arrived outside Fort Augustus.

The siege

Fort Augustus is at the south-west end of Loch Ness, at a key junction of the military roads constructed after 1715; built in 1729, the fort replaced a barracks known as Kilwhimen Barracks. Instead of being built on high ground, it was placed on a peninsula surrounded by Loch Ness and the Rivers Oich and Tarff. Cumberland felt it could not be defended for more than a few days, and wrote that Fort William was the only one of any importance.

Square in plan with angled bastions on each corner, the fort was designed "more ... for ornament than strength", as a demonstration of the government presence in the Scottish Highlands. The walls were weak, while the six-pounder guns that provided defensive fire were installed on top of the four bastions, in full view of an attacking force. The garrison consisted of three companies from Guise's Regiment, commanded by Major Hugh Wentworth. He lacked trained gunners and stationed one of his companies in the old Kiliwhimen Barracks, an isolated position to the south of the fort. This was quickly taken by the French regulars under Stapleton, and his engineer Grant began siege operations on 22 February 1746.

According to an eye witness, the Jacobites had three batteries, one opposite the main gate and two firing from the north. These had little effect, with most of the damage being done by three coehorn mortars; on the first day, a shell from one of these blew up the fort's magazine, destroying one of its bastions. A second shot caused the explosion of another magazine the next day, but firing then continued for another four days without further impact. The garrison capitulated on 1 March without any casualties, and Wentworth was considered to have surrendered too early; he was subsequently court-martialled and dismissed from the army.

Aftermath

The Jacobites moved on to Fort William, the last government strong point along the Great Glen, a much stronger facility. The siege of Fort William was abandoned in early April.

References

Sources

External links
 
 

Fort Augustus
Fort Augustus
1746 in Great Britain
Conflicts in 1746
History of the Scottish Highlands
1746 in Scotland